Eronildo dos Santos Rocha (born 16 July 1998), simply known as Eron, is a Brazilian professional footballer who plays as forward for Vitória.

References

1998 births
Living people
Brazilian footballers
Brazil youth international footballers
Association football forwards
Campeonato Brasileiro Série A players
Esporte Clube Vitória players
Sportspeople from Salvador, Bahia